Sanu John Varghese is an Indian cinematographer, who has worked in the Hindi, Malayalam, Tamil and Telugu films. After beginning his career as a technician in DD News, commercials and documentaries, he worked on Hindi, Tamil and Malayalam films. He won acclaim for his work in Kamal Haasan's spy thriller, Vishwaroopam (2013).

Career
Sanu Varghese attended College of Fine Arts Trivandrum and upon graduation went on to join the Sarojini Naidu School of Arts and Communication at University of Hyderabad, before beginning work with DD News. He became acquainted with Ravi K. Chandran and assisted him on a couple of ventures and documentaries, before making his debut as an independent cinematographer with Main Madhuri Dixit Banna Chahti Hoon (2003). He continued to work on commercials, filming over six hundred, before getting opportunities to work on the Hindi film Karthik Calling Karthik (2010) and the Malayalam psychological thriller, Elektra (2010). During the period, he also began work on Kamal Haasan's historical Tamil film, Marmayogi, but the film was shelved after pre-production.

In early 2010, Kamal Haasan called Varghese to work with him on the production of his bilingual spy-thriller Vishwaroopam (2013). The film subsequently was in production for two years, with Varghese working extensively on travelling the globe to find locations to shoot. He won acclaim for his work in capturing the terrain of Jordan, which was shown as Afghanistan in the film, and the technical brilliance of the film was noted by his peers in the film industry. The team of the film also shot for significant portions of a sequel during the making of the first film, though Varghese's busy schedule meant that he was unable to join the team for further schedules of the sequel. He also later collaborated with Kamal Haasan during the making of the bilingual Thoongaa Vanam (2015) and A. R. Rahman for videos in his album, Raunaq.

Filmography

As cinematographer

As Director

References

External links
 

Living people
Telugu film cinematographers
Malayalam film cinematographers
Tamil film cinematographers
Artists from Kottayam
Cinematographers from Kerala
Year of birth missing (living people)